On 11 May 2010, the Pakistani Ambassador to Iran Mohammad Bax Abbasi, survived an assassination attempt on his life in Tehran.  The Pakistani ambassador was injured in the attack.  This was a second attack on a Pakistan mission; the first attack took place in the Pakistan embassy in 2009.

According to the Iranian news sources and police investigations, the attacker was a 21-year-old "Afghan citizen" with whom the ambassador were involved in some altercation.  According to the Pakistani news media, the ambassador was in the hospital sustained minimal injuries. Abbasi has been a banker prior to his appointment to this diplomatic assignment. The Iranian Students' News Agency (ISNA) also reported that the "ambassador was on his way he had a clash with an attacker, he was injured on the head and fell. The attacker was arrested by the Iranian police and Tehran prosecutor-general told IRNA news agency that: "during the interrogation, the accused said he wanted to mug the ambassador." After a check-up at the local hospital, the ambassador was discharge from the hospital on May 13, 2010.

References

External links
Pakistan's Iran ambassador injured in attack

2010 in Iran
Iran–Pakistan relations
Afghanistan–Pakistan relations
Mass murder in 2010
Failed assassination attempts in Asia
Attacks on diplomatic missions of Pakistan
Attacks on diplomatic missions in Iran
21st century in Tehran
May 2010 events in Iran
Attacks in Iran in 2010